Robert LawrenceWilkie (3 July 1920 – 9 September 2001) was an Australian rules footballer who played with St Kilda in the Victorian Football League (VFL). In 1940 he weighed just 9 stone 6 pounds (60 kilograms) and was regarded as the lightest player in the league.

During World War II he served with the RAAF. In 1946 he married Dorothy Meehan, whose brothers, Jack and Tom, also played for St Kilda.

He later held various coaching and administrative posts at the St Kilda club.

His full-time job was with the Herald Sun newspaper. He lived in the Melbourne suburb of Cheltenham.

Notes

External links 

1920 births
2001 deaths
Australian rules footballers from Ballarat
St Kilda Football Club players
St Kilda Football Club administrators
St Kilda Football Club coaches
Royal Australian Air Force personnel of World War II
Royal Australian Air Force airmen